Violetta is a female given name. Notable people with the name include:

Violetta (performer) (1907–1973), real name Aloisia Wagner, German performer born without arms and legs
Violetta Blue, a name previously used by the American pornographic actress now known as Noname Jane
Violetta Bovt (1927–1995), Russian-American ballet dancer
Violetta Caldart (born 1969), an Italian curler
Violetta Elvin (1924–2021), Russian prima ballerina
Violetta Kolobova (born 1991), Russian fencer
Violetta Napierska (1890–1968), Italian film actress, also active in German silent films
Violetta Oblinger-Peters (born 1977), German-born, Austrian slalom canoer
Violetta Parisini (born 1980), Austrian singer
Violetta Quesada (born 1947), Cuban retired sprinter
Violetta Villas (1938–2011), Polish singer and actress
Violetta Zironi (born 1995), Italian singer

Fictional characters
Violetta Valéry, main role in Verdi's opera La traviata
Dr.Violetta Salazar, the late Mexican mother of the titular character of Generator Rex
Violetta Castillo, the titular protagonist of the Argentine Disney Channel telenovela Violetta (2012–2015)

See also 
Viola (given name)
Violet (given name)
Violeta (given name)
Violette (given name)

Feminine given names
Given names derived from plants or flowers